Linus Öberg (born 18 July 2000) is a Swedish professional ice hockey player who currently plays for Örebro HK of the Swedish Hockey League (SHL).

Playing career
He made his SHL debut with Örebro HK during the 2018–19 season. Öberg was drafted by the San Jose Sharks in the seventh round, 206th overall, in the 2020 NHL Entry Draft.

Career statistics

References

External links

2000 births
Living people
People from Vänersborg Municipality
San Jose Sharks draft picks
Swedish ice hockey centres
Örebro HK players
Sportspeople from Västra Götaland County